Kyuquot Water Aerodrome  is located adjacent to Kyuquot, British Columbia, Canada.

References

Seaplane bases in British Columbia
Strathcona Regional District
Registered aerodromes in British Columbia